Burt is an English surname. Notable people with the surname include:

Albert Levi Burt (1843–1903), book publisher
Alfred Burt (1920–1954), American jazz musician
Alfred Alexander Burt (1895–1962), English recipient of the Victoria Cross
Alistair Burt (born 1955), British politician
Andrew Burt (1945–2018), British actor
Archibald Burt (1810–1879), British lawyer and first Chief Justice of the Supreme Court of Western Australia
Cyril Burt (1883–1971), British psychologist
David Burt (born 1953), British actor
Francis Burt (1918–2004), Governor of Western Australia
Francis Burt (Nebraska governor) (1807–1854), first governor of the Nebraska Territory
George Burt (disambiguation), several people
Heinz Burt (1942–2000), British singer, best known by his first name
Helen Burt, British-Canadian pharmaceutical scientist
Jake Burt (born 1996), American football player
James Burt (disambiguation), several people
Jo Burt (born 1956), British heavy metal bassist
John Graham MacDonald Burt (1809-1868), Scottish physician
Kelvin Burt (born 1967), British auto racing driver
Leo Burt (born 1948), indicted American bomber
Lorely Burt (born 1954), British politician
Luke Burt (born 1981), Australian professional rugby league player 
Lulu May Burt (1865-1953), American actress and singer, better known as Helen Bertram
Marshall Burt (born 1976), Wyoming state representative
Mary Towne Burt (1842-1898), American reformer, publisher, benefactor
Maxwell Struthers Burt (1882–1954), American novelist, poet, and short-story writer
Patsy Burt (1928–2001), British racing driver
Richard Burt (born 1947), American diplomat
Robert Burt (1873 – 1955) African American physician and surgeon
Robert F. Burt (1948 – 2014) American Navy officer and Chaplain
Septimus Burt (1847–1919), Western Australian lawyer, politician and grazier
Silas W. Burt (1830–1912), civil service reformer and naval officer
Thomas Burt (1837–1922), British trade unionist and Member of Parliament
Warren Burt (born 1949), Australian composer
Wellington R. Burt (1831–1919), American industrialist
William Austin Burt (1792–1858), American inventor, legislator, surveyor and millwright

English-language surnames